The Tony Rock Project is a sketch comedy television series that premiered on October 8, 2008 on MyNetworkTV. It stars Tony Rock, John Heffron and Whitney Cummings. It served as the lead-in for Flavor Flav's sitcom, Under One Roof.

References

External links 
 

2008 American television series debuts
2000s American sketch comedy television series
2009 American television series endings